Sergei Leonidovich Aleksandrov (7 December 1973 in Cheboksary – 21 February 2018) was a Russian football player.

In 1992, when a player of FC Nyva Ternopil, Aleksandrov represented Ukraine as part of Ukraine national under-21 football team in its first game on October 28 against Belarus in Ternopil.

He represented Russia at the 1993 FIFA World Youth Championship.

References

External links
 

1973 births
2018 deaths
People from Cheboksary
Soviet footballers
Russian footballers
Association football goalkeepers
Ukraine under-21 international footballers
Russia youth international footballers
Russian expatriate footballers
Ukrainian Premier League players
Expatriate footballers in Ukraine
Expatriate footballers in Bulgaria
FC Nyva Ternopil players
PFC Pirin Gotse Delchev players
FC Orenburg players
FC Luch Vladivostok players
FC Energiya Volzhsky players
FC Lokomotiv Moscow players
Sportspeople from Chuvashia